Robert and Cortney Novogratz, known collectively as The Novogratz, are an American husband and wife design team based in Los Angeles since 2014.  They began their careers in Manhattan in real estate. They have become interior and product designers, and have appeared on reality TV. They are  the parents of seven children. Their shows are Bravo's 9 by Design and HGTV's Home by Novogratz.

Early life
Robert grew up in Alexandria, Virginia (b. February 11, 1963) and attended public schools. Cortney  was born in Columbus, Georgia on September 8, 1971, and also attended public schools. Robert's siblings include Michael Novogratz and Jacqueline Novogratz.

The couple met in Charlotte, North Carolina. They moved together to New York City, where they married and first worked in real estate. Through this work, they gradually developed more practice and ideas about design, and began to be hired to create interior spaces.

References

External links
The Novogratz Website 

American interior designers
Married couples
American television hosts
People from Alexandria, Virginia
Artists from New York City
1963 births
1971 births
Living people